Oratorio di San Rocco, an oratory for Saint Roch, may refer to:

 Oratorio di San Rocco, Cailungo
 Oratorio di San Rocco, Siena
 Oratorio di San Rocco, Spezzano